Powell Weaver (1890–1951) was an American composer, organist, pianist who was active in the midwest during the early 20th century and who wrote some organ pieces that are included in recitals today.

Early life 

Powell Weaver was born on June 10, 1890 in Clearfield, Pennsylvania. He attended Clearfield High School and then the Institute of Musical Art (now the Juilliard School) in New York. His teachers were organ, Gaston Dethier, composition, Marjorie Goetschius and piano, Carolyn Beebe. He also studied organ privately with Pietro Yon for two years. In Italy his teachers were  Composition, Ottorino Respighi and organ with Remigio Renzi. He married composer and organist Mary Watson Weaver  on March 24, 1938, and they had one son (Thomas Watson Weaver).

Professional assignments 

All of Weaver's professional positions were in the city of Kansas City, Missouri. He was first organist for the Grand Avenue United Methodist Temple from 1918 through 1938 where he presided over the distinguished and venerable 4 manual, Ernest M. Skinner organ described by organist Frederick Hohman as "the oldest original and intact 4 manual Ernest M. Skinner Organ (1912)". He then went on to be organist and director of music for the First Baptist Church (1938-1951)  and also Temple B'nai Jehudah.

Composer 

Weaver is best remembered for his organ works which include:

 The Squirrel
 Bell Benedictus
 The Cuckooo
 Exultation: piéce symphonique, for organ and piano
 Copper Country Sketches  
 Transcription for organ of Toccata by Pietro Domenico Paradies 
He also collaborated on some choral works with his wife:

 Like Doves Descending (with Mary Watson Weaver; mixed chorus; 1952)
 On the Eve of the First Christmas (with Mary Watson Weaver; mixed chorus; 1948) 
 When Jesus Lay by Mary's Side (with Mary Watson Weaver; mixed chorus; 1951)

Death 
Powell died on December 22, 1951  in Oakland, California.

References

1890 births
1951 deaths
American classical organists
People from Clearfield, Pennsylvania
20th-century organists
20th-century classical musicians